Metabolic Engineering is a peer-reviewed scientific journal covering research on production of fuels and chemicals using microorganisms and other biological systems. The journal specialises in quantitative analyses of metabolic pathways and their relationship to cell physiology in industrial and medical contexts.

Abstracting and indexing 
The journal is abstracted and indexed in Biotechnology Citation Index, Chemical Abstracts Service, Current Contents/Life Sciences, Clinical Medicine, EMBASE, EMBiology, MEDLINE, and Scopus.

External links 
 

Elsevier academic journals
Biotechnology journals
English-language journals
Publications established in 1999
Bimonthly journals